Aleksandar Yanev (born December 6, 1990) is a Bulgarian professional basketball player. He currently plays for Beroe. He is also a member of the Bulgarian national team.

Career
Yanev began his pro career with the Bulgarian League club Cherno More Varna, during the 2006-07 season. In February 2012 joined for two months Greek side Kavala.

On 11 January 2017, he signed for Zadar

External links
 Aleksandar Yanev at bgbasket.com

References

1990 births
Living people
Bàsquet Manresa players
BC Beroe players
BC Levski Sofia players
Bulgarian expatriate basketball people in Spain
Bulgarian men's basketball players
Club San Martín de Corrientes basketball players
Bulgarian expatriate basketball people in Argentina
Bulgarian expatriate basketball people in Greece
Kavala B.C. players
KK Zadar players
Liga ACB players
PBC Academic players
Small forwards
Sportspeople from Varna, Bulgaria